Trevor Keith Hill (born 28 July 1943) is an English Labour Party politician who served as Member of Parliament for Streatham from 1992 until 2010, as well as in a variety of Government roles as a Whip and a junior minister.

Early life and career
Hill was born in Leicester and educated at City Boys' Grammar School, from where he won a scholarship to Corpus Christi College, Oxford. He completed a Diploma in Education at University College of Wales, Aberystwyth.

He was then a politics lecturer, firstly in the University of Leicester and at the University of Strathclyde from 1969–1973. He worked as a research officer for the Labour Party's International Department from 1974–1976 before becoming a political officer for the National Union of Railwaymen, subsequently amalgamated into the National Union of Rail, Maritime and Transport Workers (RMT). In the 1979 general election he stood unsuccessfully as Labour Candidate in Blaby.

Political career
In the 1992 election, Hill outperformed Labour's national performance by being the first Labour MP elected for the Streatham constituency.  He defeated the incumbent Conservative MP Sir William Shelton by a convincing margin. This partly reflected changing demographics in the constituency, which includes a large swathe of Brixton.

Following his election as an MP, he served on the Select Committee for Transport from 1992 to 1997. His first Government appointment was as Parliamentary Private Secretary to Hilary Armstrong in 1997. He became an Assistant Government Whip from 1998 to 1999.

Keith Hill's ministerial career started when he was appointed as Parliamentary Under Secretary for Transport (as well as Minister for London) at the then Department of Environment, Transport and the Regions (DETR) in 1999. During his time at DETR, he was responsible for local transport and transport in London.

As Minister for London, Keith Hill was closely involved in preparing the way for London mayoral elections. This was a task that he took to with clear relish – regional television viewers saw Mr Hill doing a rap in the middle of Trafalgar Square with a baseball hat on back to front to try to encourage young Londoners to vote in the elections.

In the ministerial appointments following the 2001 election, Keith Hill moved to the position of Deputy Chief Whip. In a 13 June 2003 reshuffle, Hill was promoted to Minister of State rank and joined the Privy Council. He served as Minister for Housing and Planning at the Office of the Deputy Prime Minister until the 2005 General Election. During this period he had lead responsibility for housing, planning, the Thames Gateway, urban policy and liveability issues, and was Minister for London and the Dome. In the reshuffle following the 2005 general election, Keith Hill was appointed Parliamentary Private Secretary to the Prime Minister, Tony Blair. He returned to the backbenches on Gordon Brown becoming Prime Minister in June 2007.

Hill stood down at the 2010 general election. He was offered a knighthood in the 2010 Dissolution Honours, but declined the honour, saying he would find the "whole idea a little embarrassing and too much for me".

After leaving parliament, Hill become the chair of Lambeth Living, an ALMO (arm's length management organisation) which administers most of Lambeth Council's social housing stock.

In 2012 Keith Hill was appointed as the independent regulator for the Association of Residential Managing Agents (ARMA) new self-regulatory regime. ARMA is a trade association for firms that manage private residential leasehold blocks of flats in England & Wales and Hill's appointment marks the first time that managing agents have been subject to independent regulation.

Keith Hill was confirmed by Hammersmith & Fulham Council in February 2015 as Chair of the Residents' Commission on Council Housing.

Personal life
Now married, Hill once shared a flat with actor/comedian Eddie Izzard.

Other
Hill was described by Routledge's Almanac of British Politics as "One of the government's insufficiently sung heroes".

References

External links

Keith Hill official site 
Guardian Unlimited Politics – Ask Aristotle: Keith Hill MP
TheyWorkForYou.com – Keith Hill MP voting record
 

|-

1943 births
Living people
Academics of the University of Leicester
Alumni of Aberystwyth University
Alumni of Corpus Christi College, Oxford
Labour Party (UK) MPs for English constituencies
Members of the Privy Council of the United Kingdom
Treasurers of the Household
People educated at City of Leicester Boys' Grammar School
Politicians from Leicester
Parliamentary Private Secretaries to the Prime Minister
UK MPs 1992–1997
UK MPs 1997–2001
UK MPs 2001–2005
UK MPs 2005–2010
20th-century English politicians
21st-century English politicians
Ministers of State for Housing (UK)